Epigenetics & Chromatin is a peer-reviewed open access scientific journal published by BioMed Central that covers the biology of epigenetics and chromatin.

Scope 
Epigenetics & Chromatin is a peer-reviewed open access scientific journal that publishes research related to epigenetic inheritance and chromatin-based interactions. First published in 2008 by BioMed Central, its overall aim is to understand the regulation of gene and chromosomal elements during the processes of cell division, cell differentiation, and any alterations in the environment. To date, 13 volumes have been published.

Usage 

As of October 2020, there has been over 340,000 downloads and over 750 Altmetric mentions.

Metrics

Impact factor 
According to Journal Citation Reports, it received an impact factor of 4.237 in 2019. Its current SCImago Journal Rank is 2.449.

Citation impact 
Its 2-year and 5-year citation impact factor is 4.237 and 4.763, respectively. Its Source Normalized Impact per Paper (SNIP) is 0.896.

Editors 
Its current Journal Authority Factor (JAF) is 111.5.

Editors-in-Chief

Editorial Board

Submission guidelines 

Current submission guidelines are as follows:

Prior to submitting 

Submitters must ensure that Epigenetics & Chromatin is the most suitable journal for the proposed article in addition to understanding of the costs, funding options, and copyright agreement associated with submission. Accuracy and readability of the manuscript must also be considered.

During the submission process 

The manuscript must follow all formatting rules which authors must read, understand and accept.

After successful submission 

Authors should review the peer-review policy. Authors should also be familiar with the process of manuscript transfers to a different journal, as well as how to promote the publication.

Speed of the submission process 
On average, it takes 53 days to reach a decision for reviewed manuscripts and 35 days for all manuscripts. The process of acceptance takes an average of 112 days after submission. After acceptance, it takes an average of 16 days for an article to be published.

Indexing services 
After successful publication in Epigenetics & Chromatin, articles are also included in:

 Biological Abstracts
 Chemical Abstracts (CAS)
 Citebase
 Directory of Open Access Journals (DOAJ)
 Embase
 EMBiology
 MEDLINE
 OAIster
 PubMed
 PubMed Central (PMC)
 Science Citation Index Expanded
 Scopus
 SOCOLAR
 Zetoc (operated by Jisc)

Notable publications 
As of October 2020, the most accessed articles are:
 Chromatin accessibility: a window into the genome (Tsompana & Buck, 2014)
 Constitutive heterochromatin formation and transcription in mammals (Saksouk et al., 2015)
 Chromatin structure and DNA damage repair (Dinant et al., 2008)
 Profiling genome-wide DNA methylation (Yong et al., 2016)
 Additional annotation enhances potential for biologically relevant analysis of the Illumina Infinium HumanMethylation450 BeadChip Array (Price et al., 2013)

References

External links 
 

BioMed Central academic journals
Online-only journals
Genetics journals
Publications established in 2008
English-language journals
Creative Commons Attribution-licensed journals